Kazemabad (also Romanized as Kāz̧emābād; also known as Kāzimābād) is a village in Talkh Ab Rural District, Khenejin District, Farahan County, Markazi Province, Iran. At the 2006 census, its population was 110, in 31 families.

References 

Populated places in Farahan County